Jozef Móder (born 19 September 1947) is a former Slovak football midfielder and later coach. He is a member of the Czechoslovakia winning team at the UEFA Euro 1976. He was known as corner kick specialist.

Overall, he played 318 matches and scored 75 goals in the Czechoslovak First League.

Móder made his international debut for the Czechoslovakia national football team in a 6-0 home win against Luxembourg on 26 April 1972. He scored three goals in the UEFA Euro 1976 qualifying quarter-final against Soviet Union, helping Czechoslovakia to progress to the final tournament.

Honours
UEFA European Football Championship
Champions: 1976
Czechoslovak Cup
1977, 1979
Austrian Cup
1981

External links
 ČMFS entry 

1947 births
Living people
Slovak footballers
Czechoslovak footballers
Czechoslovakia international footballers
UEFA Euro 1976 players
UEFA European Championship-winning players
FK Inter Bratislava players
Dukla Prague footballers
Grazer AK players
Slovak football managers
FC VSS Košice managers
Czechoslovak expatriate footballers
Czechoslovak expatriate sportspeople in Austria
Expatriate footballers in Austria
Association football midfielders
People from Nové Zámky District
Sportspeople from the Nitra Region